Dennis Chávez   is a bronze sculpture depicting the politician of the same name by Felix de Weldon, installed in the United States Capitol in 1966, in Washington D.C., as part of the National Statuary Hall Collection. It is one of two statues donated by the state of New Mexico.

The statue is one of three that De Weldon has had placed in the Collection.

References

External links
 

1966 establishments in Washington, D.C.
1966 sculptures
Bronze sculptures in Washington, D.C.
Monuments and memorials in Washington, D.C.
Chavez, Dennis
Sculptures of men in Washington, D.C.